Oluwole Daniel Makinde is a Nigerian professor of Theoretical and Applied Physics, the Secretary General of African Mathematical Union (AMU), General Secretary and Vice President of Southern Africa Mathematical Science Association (SAMSA) and the  Director of the Institute for Advanced Research in Mathematical Modeling and Computations (IARMMC) at Cape Peninsula University of Technology, South Africa.

Education 

In 1987, Daniel Makinde obtained his first degree from Obafemi Awolowo University, Ile Ife in the field of Mathematics. In 1990,  He also obtained his MSc degree in Applied and Computational Mathematics from the same Alma mater and in 1996, he bagged his doctorate degree from the University of Bristol, United Kingdom.

Awards and honors 

 He is an advisory board member of the Pan African Centre of Mathematics (PACM) based in Tanzania
 He is an advisory board member of the Centre for Applied Research in Mathematical Sciences (CARMS) at Inmore University in Kenya.
 He is an associate member of the National Institute of Theoretical Physics (NITheP) in South Africa.
 In 2014, he received the Nigerian National Honour Award, MFR, for his numerous contributions to mathematics
In 2011, he won the African Union Kwame Nkrumah Continental Scientific Award for his excellent contributions to basic science in Africa.
In 2012, he became a fellow of the African Academy of Sciences
In 2013, he became a fellow of the Papua New Guinea Mathematical Society in recognition of his outreach contributions.

References 

Living people
Nigerian scientists
Obafemi Awolowo University alumni
Alumni of the University of Bristol
Academic staff of Cape Peninsula University of Technology
South African mathematicians
Year of birth missing (living people)